The Men's under-23 road race of the 2013 UCI Road World Championships took place in Tuscany, Italy on 27 September 2013.

Qualification

Final classification

Source

References

Men's under-23 road race
UCI Road World Championships – Men's under-23 road race
2013 in men's road cycling